Gretna is a city in Gadsden County, Florida, United States. The population was 1,460 as of the 2010 census, down from 1,709 at the 2000 census.

Gretna is part of the Tallahassee, Florida Metropolitan Statistical Area.

Geography

Gretna is in west-central Gadsden County at  (30.615598, –84.662457). The city limits have expanded south and west  to encompass part of Interstate 10; the city is now bordered on the south by Greensboro.

U.S. Route 90 passes through Gretna as Main Street; it leads southeast  to Quincy, the Gadsden County seat, and northwest  to Chattahoochee. Interstate 10 passes through the southwest part of Gretna, with access from Exit 174 (Florida State Road 12). I-10 leads east  to Tallahassee and west  to Pensacola. SR 12 leads southwest  to Bristol, and SR 65 leads south  to Hosford.

Demographics

2020 census

As of the 2020 United States census, there were 1,357 people, 465 households, and 253 families residing in the city.

2000 census
As of the census of 2000, there were 1,709 people, 503 households, and 401 families residing in the city. The racial makeup of the city was 88.41% African American, 6.14% White, 0.18% Native American, 0.12% Asian, 4.68% from other races, and 0.47% from two or more races. Hispanic or Latino of any race were 9.65% of the population.

There were 503 households, out of which 41.0% had children under the age of 18 living with them, 41.0% were married couples living together, 31.2% had a female householder with no husband present, and 20.1% were non-families. 18.1% of all households were made up of individuals, and 6.6% had someone living alone who was 65 years of age or older. The average household size was 3.40 and the average family size was 3.84.

In the city, the population was spread out, with 35.0% under the age of 18, 11.2% from 18 to 24, 28.1% from 25 to 44, 17.7% from 45 to 64, and 8.0% who were 65 years of age or older. The median age was 28 years. For every 100 females, there were 93.5 males. For every 100 females age 18 and over, there were 87.2 males.

The median income for a household in the city was $24,769, and the median income for a family was $26,176. Males had a median income of $20,819 versus $17,955 for females. The per capita income for the city was $9,062. About 25.9% of families and 30.6% of the population were below the poverty line, including 43.3% of those under age 18 and 24.2% of those age 65 or over.

Government and infrastructure

The U.S. Postal Service operates the Gretna Post Office.

The county government operates the Brenda A. Holt Gadsden County Gretna Public Safety Complex.

The Gretna Volunteer Fire Department operates one fire station.

The Gadsden Connector, a Big Bend Transit bus route, has a stop in Gretna.

Education

The Gadsden County School District operates area public schools.

Residents in PreK–3 are served by Greensboro Primary School and residents in grades 4–5 are served by West Gadsden Middle School. Gretna Elementary School, which previously served elementary school students, closed in 2017.

 Gadsden County High School (previously East Gadsden High School) is the only zoned high school in the county, due to the consolidation of West Gadsden High School's high school section into East Gadsden High.

Gallery

References

External links

City of Gretna official website

Cities in Gadsden County, Florida
Tallahassee metropolitan area
Cities in Florida
African-American history of Florida